Cumberland (North Riding) was an electoral district of the Legislative Assembly in the Australian state of New South Wales from 1856 to 1859, in Cumberland County, which includes Sydney. It included all of the county north of Parramatta Road and the Great Western Highway, except for the urban electorates of Sydney (City), Sydney Hamlets, Parramatta and Cumberland Boroughs, which included Richmond and Windsor. It elected two members simultaneously, with voters casting two votes and the first two candidates being elected. It was abolished in 1859 and the district was divided between Central Cumberland, Windsor, Nepean and St Leonards.

Members for Cumberland (North Riding)

Election results

References

Former electoral districts of New South Wales
1856 establishments in Australia
Constituencies established in 1856
1859 disestablishments in Australia
Constituencies disestablished in 1859